The Journal of Comparative Psychology is a peer-reviewed academic journal published by the American Psychological Association. It covers research from a comparative perspective on the behavior, cognition, perception, and social relationships of diverse species.

The journal has implemented the Transparency and Openness Promotion (TOP) Guidelines.  The TOP Guidelines provide structure to research planning and reporting and aim to make research more transparent, accessible, and reproducible.

History
The journal was established in 1921 through the merger of Psychobiology and the Journal of Animal Behavior. It was renamed Journal of Comparative and Physiological Psychology in 1947, and reestablished in 1983 when the journal was split into Behavioral Neuroscience and the Journal of Comparative Psychology. Past editors-in-chief include Jerry Hirsch (1983), Gordon Gallup (1989), Charles Snowdon (1994), Meredith West (2001), Gordon Burghardt (2005), and Josep Call (2017). The current editor is Dorothy M. Fragaszy.

Abstracting and indexing 
The journal is abstracted and indexed by MEDLINE/PubMed and the Social Sciences Citation Index. According to the Journal Citation Reports, the journal has a 2020 impact factor of 2.231.

References

External links 
 

Quarterly journals
Comparative psychology journals
Publications established in 1921
American Psychological Association academic journals